In topology and related areas of mathematics, a Stone space, also known as a profinite space or profinite set, is a compact totally disconnected Hausdorff space. Stone spaces are named after Marshall Harvey Stone who introduced and studied them in the 1930s in the course of his investigation of Boolean algebras, which culminated in his representation theorem for Boolean algebras.

Equivalent conditions 
The following conditions on the topological space  are equivalent:

  is a Stone space;
  is homeomorphic to the projective limit (in the category of topological spaces) of an inverse system of finite discrete spaces;
  is compact and totally separated;
  is compact, T0 , and zero-dimensional (in the sense of the small inductive dimension);
  is coherent and Hausdorff.

Examples 
Important examples of Stone spaces include finite discrete spaces, the Cantor set and the space  of -adic integers, where  is any prime number.  Generalizing these examples, any product of finite discrete spaces is a Stone space, and the topological space underlying any profinite group is a Stone space. The Stone–Čech compactification of the natural numbers with the discrete topology, or indeed of any discrete space, is a Stone space.

Stone's representation theorem for Boolean algebras 

Stone's representation theorem for Boolean algebras states that every Boolean algebra is isomorphic to the Boolean algebra of clopen sets of the Stone space ; and furthermore, every Stone space  is homeomorphic to the Stone space belonging to the Boolean algebra of clopen sets of  These assignments are functorial, and we obtain a category-theoretic duality between the category of Boolean algebras (with homomorphisms as morphisms) and the category of Stone spaces (with continuous maps as morphisms).

Stone's theorem gave rise to a number of similar dualities, now collectively known as Stone dualities.

Condensed mathematics 
The category of Stone spaces with continuous maps is equivalent to the pro-category of the category of finite sets, which explains the term "profinite sets". The profinite sets are at the heart of the project of condensed mathematics, which aims to replace topological spaces with "condensed sets", where a topological space X is replaced by the functor that takes a profinite set S to the set of continuous maps from S to X.

See also

References

Further reading 

Boolean algebra
Categorical logic
General topology